Le portefaix (The Porter) (full title Le portefaix ou le jardinier de Grenade (The Porter, or the Gardener of Grenada)) is an opéra comique in three acts composed by José Melchor Gomis. The libretto by Eugène Scribe is based on an episode in Le Comte de Villamayor by M. Mortonval (Alexandre Furcy Guesdon). It was originally offered to the composer Giacomo Meyerbeer, but he was contracted instead by the opera manager Louis Véron to create a five-act grand opera (Les Huguenots).

The opera was premiered on 16 June 1835 by the Opéra-Comique at the Théâtre des Nouveautés in Paris with Jean-Baptiste Chollet and Jeanne-Emélie Belloste in the lead roles of Gasparillo and Teresita.

Roles

References

Sources
 Letellier, Robert (2014). Meyerbeer’s Les Huguenots: An Evangel of Religion and Love. Cambridge: Cambridge Scholars Publishing. 

Operas
1835 operas
French-language operas
Operas set in Spain
Libretti by Eugène Scribe